Scaphisoma is a genus of beetles belonging to the family Staphylinidae.

The genus has cosmopolitan distribution.

Species:
 Scaphisoma ablutum Löbl, 2015 
 Scaphisoma absurdum Löbl, 1986

References

Staphylinidae
Staphylinidae genera